Lafayette Township is a township in Chautauqua County, Kansas, USA.  As of the 2000 census, its population was 65.

Geography
According to the USGS, it contains three cemeteries: Crum, Saint Charles and Union Chapel.

The streams of Bachelor Creek, Broker Creek, Coon Creek, Coon Creek, North Salt Creek and Turkey Creek run through this township.

References
 USGS Geographic Names Information System (GNIS)

External links
 US-Counties.com
 City-Data.com

Townships in Chautauqua County, Kansas
Townships in Kansas